The Blériot-SPAD S.34 was a French twin-seat, single-engine biplane flight training aircraft designed in 1920.  The side-by-side seating arrangement was unique for its time. 150 aircraft were built, 125 for the French Air Force, who used them until 1936.

The Finnish Air Force purchased two S.34s in 1921. Due to inadequate maintenance they did not last long and were withdrawn from service by 1925.

Variants
 Bleriot-SPAD S.34-1
 First Bleriot-SPAD S.34 prototype.
 Bleriot-SPAD S.34-2
 Second Bleriot-SPAD S.34 prototype.
 Bleriot-SPAD S.34-3
 Third Bleriot-SPAD S.34 prototype.
 Bleriot-SPAD S.34
 Two-seat primary trainer biplane. 
 Bleriot-SPAD S.34 bis 
 Improved variant, powered by a 130-hp (97-kW) Clêrget 9B rotary piston engine. Three were built for the Aéronavale.

Operators
 
 Aéronautique Militaire - (119 aircraft)
 Aéronavale - (6 S.34-bis aircraft)
 Blériot flying school - (16 aircraft)
 
 (6 aircraft)
  
 Finnish Air Force - (2 aircraft)
 
 Bolivian Air Force (1 aircraft)

Specification (S.34)

References

 
 Keskinen, Kalevi; Partonen, Kyösti and Stenman, Kari: Suomen Ilmavoimat I 1918-27, 2005. .
 Keskinen, Kalevi; Stenman, Kari and Niska, Klaus: Suomen ilmavoimien lentokoneet 1918-1939, Tietoteos, 1976.

External links

 "1921 Paris Air Salon: SPAD 34" FLIGHT, November 24, 1921, page 778 for photo and page 779 for description

Blériot aircraft
Single-engined tractor aircraft
Biplanes
1920s French military trainer aircraft
Aircraft first flown in 1920
Rotary-engined aircraft